Gin Gin is a small town in New South Wales, Australia.  It is located within the Narromine Shire local government area, just north-east of Trangie, New South Wales. At the 2006 census, Gin Gin had a population of 112 people.

See also 
 List of reduplicated Australian place names

References 

Towns in New South Wales
Populated places in New South Wales
Localities in New South Wales
Geography of New South Wales